Jean de Moulins was a French Dominican and prelate, who was incardinated in the Toulouse province. In 1344 was appointed Inquisitor of the kingdom of France and from 1345 to 1349 Master of the Sacred Palace. He was elected Master General of the Dominican Order in 1349.

One year later he was appointed as Cardinal of Santa Sabina in the Consistory of 17 December 1350 and resigned from the order. He died on 23 February 1353.

1353 deaths
14th-century French cardinals
French Dominicans
Year of birth unknown
Masters of the Order of Preachers
Dominican cardinals